Hans Henri Smalhout (31 December 1920 – 31 October 1942) was a Dutch professional ice hockey right wing who played for the Dutch national ice hockey team. He appeared in the 1939 Ice Hockey World Championship. Smalhout, who was Jewish, was arrested and killed in the Auschwitz concentration camp in 1942.

Career statistics

Club career

International career

References

1920 births
1942 deaths
Sportspeople from North Holland
Dutch ice hockey right wingers
Dutch civilians killed in World War II
Dutch Jews who died in the Holocaust
Dutch people who died in Auschwitz concentration camp
People from Velsen